Galapa is a genus of Ecuadorian cellar spiders that was first described by B. A. Huber in 2000.  it contains only three species, found only on the Galápagos Islands: G. baerti, G. bella, and G. floreana.

See also
 List of Pholcidae species

References

Araneomorphae genera
Pholcidae